Glenorie Bus Company was an Australian bus company in the Hills District of Sydney.

History
Bus services in the Glenorie area commenced in the 1920s when George Deaman began operating. In 1952 Deaman sold out to Roy Baxter and George Tucknott. In 1975 the business was sold to Keith Todd with 16 buses. In April 1988 Dural Busways was purchased.

In December 2001 Glenorie was purchased by National Express but the business was not merged with its neighbouring Westbus operation. Instead it operated on its own until December 2004, when Glenorie, along with Westbus' routes that operated out of Seven Hills and Northmead depots, were all rebranded Hillsbus.

The following are the routes that were operated by Glenorie prior to their rebranding to Hillsbus.
631: Hornsby - Pennant Hills - Castle Hill via Castle Hill Road
632: Hornsby - Pennant Hills - Castle Hill via David Road
633: Pennant Hills - Castle Hill via Coonara Avenue
634: Pennant Hills - Castle Hill - Castlewood Estate
635: Macquarie Centre - Beecroft - West Pennant Hills Valley - Castle Hill
636: Pennant Hills - Castle Hill - Glenhaven
637: Pennant Hills - Castle Hill - Glenorie
638: Pennant Hills - Castle Hill - Berrilee
639: Pennant Hills - Castle Hill - Kenthurst (Pitt Town Road)
640: Pennant Hills - Castle Hill - Kenthurst (Porters Road)
641: Pennant Hills - Castle Hill - Annangrove Road

The Hillsbus brand actually existed since 2002 as a joint venture between Westbus and Glenorie. Hillsbus introduced a new route 642 on 11 February 2002 between Dural and the city. Hillsbus introduced another three routes from West Pennant Hills to the City on 8 July that year, All four routes operated under the Hillsbus brand. These express routes operated via the M2 and were known as "M2 City" express services. These routes, though operated by Glenorie according to timetables, did not use Westbus or Glenorie buses. 

The "M2 City" routes that Glenorie operated were:
642: Dural - Cherrybrook - City via M2 (operates as Hillsbus)
650: West Pennant Hills - City via M2 (operates as Hillsbus)
652: West Pennant Hills - City via M2 (operates as Hillsbus)
654: Dural - West Pennant Hills - City via M2 (operates as Hillsbus)

Glenorie Coaches
In late 2009 a coach charter company was formed under the name Glenorie Coaches using the same cream and aqua as previously carried by Glenorie Bus Company.

References

External links
Showbus gallery

Bus companies of New South Wales
Bus transport in Sydney
National Express companies
2004 disestablishments in Australia
Defunct bus companies of Australia